Almenara may refer to:
 Almenara, Minas Gerais, a city in Brazil
 Almenara, Castellón, a municipality in Castellón province, Spain
 Almenara de Adaja, a municipality in Valladolid province, Spain
 Almenara de Tormes, a municipality in Salamanca province, Spain
 Puebla de Almenara, a municipality in Cuenca province, Spain
 Almenara (Madrid), a neighborhood in the district of Tetuán, in the municipality of Madrid, Community of Madrid, Spain
 Pico Almenara, the highest mountain of Sierra de Alcaraz, Spain

See also
 Battle of Almenar, a battle in Spain fought 1710